Harry Potter and the Philosopher's Stone (released in the United States as Harry Potter and the Sorcerer's Stone) is an action-adventure video game based on the 2001 film of the same name. Philosopher's Stone was initially released for the Game Boy Advance, Game Boy Color, Microsoft Windows, and PlayStation in November 2001. A different game bearing the same name was made two years later for the GameCube, PlayStation 2, and Xbox in December 2003. The versions on different platforms differ greatly from each other and do not follow the same level structures or gameplay, with somewhat varying stories as well.

The story follows protagonist Harry Potter, who, after discovering he is a wizard, is sent to Hogwarts School of Witchcraft and Wizardry where he makes friends and receives magical training, and along with his friends stop Lord Voldemort from returning to power. The game received mixed reviews, with critics saying that the game's license would be the only thing to draw in fans. The PlayStation version sold 8 million copies by May 2003, which would become Argonaut's best-selling game and one of the best-selling PlayStation video games of all time.

Gameplay
The player controls the character Harry Potter from a third-person perspective.

Windows/Mac
In the PC versions, the game is played like a third-person action and puzzle game. The story follows a linear progression, separated into levels with a specific end goal. Spells are learned progressively via lesson levels, and unlock increasingly complex puzzles. The spells featured are as follows: The Flipendo, which can be used to stun enemies and push objects around; The Alohomora Charm, which unlocks doors and chests; Wingardium Leviosa, which can levitate objects; Lumos, which causes platforms of light to appear; Incendio, which can disable aggressive plants. The storyline follows Harry through the main elements of the book's plot, including rescuing Hagrid's dragon Norbert, advancing through the various protections around the Philosopher's Stone, and eventually defeating Lord Voldemort. There are also several levels in which Harry can fly on a broomstick and play Quidditch - this gameplay can also be independently accessed through the start menu.

PlayStation
Like the Windows version, the game is a third-person action adventure game. However, the story is arranged in a completely different fashion to the PC version, and features different story events and gameplay. It was developed in the UK by Argonaut.

The game is split into seven sections, four of which can be revisited freely and explored to find collectables. Collectables in the game are either Bertie Bott's Every Flavour Beans, which can be traded with Fred and George Weasley for the password to a portrait guarding a special collectable, or Famous Witches and Wizards cards, which can be found throughout the castle or in exchange for completing mini-games.
Lower castle. Collecting yellow beans in exchange for Nimbus 2000 broom. Includes tutorial levels on climbing, jumping and flying and Charms class where you learn the Wingardium Leviosa spell. Ends with a boss challenge wizard cracker duel with Draco Malfoy and the grounds being unlocked. Mini-game involves shooting at flying items to get them back for a student.
Castle grounds. Collecting blue beans in exchange for a Famous Witch and Wizard card. Includes Herbology class, where you learn the Incendio spell, and Quidditch try-outs, where you learn how to catch the golden snitch. Boss challenge part way through is to defeat an animated gargoyle, and the race challenge is to catch Malfoy and retrieve the remembral. Includes Quidditch match between Gryffindor and Hufflepuff. Ends when you find a hidden Sloth brain, that has been stolen from Severus Snape, and return it to him. Mini-games involve collecting beans in a time limit.
Castle Dungeons. Collecting green beans in exchange for Quidditch armour. Includes Potions class, where you learn how to brew the healing Wiggenweld potion, and Defence Against the Dark Arts class, where you learn the Verdimillious spell. You are trapped in the dungeons twice: once during Potions class which involves sneaking past trolls and a second time after the class. This second time requires you to destroy four dark curses around the dungeon to unlock the door. Ends when this door is unlocked and you can return to the castle. Mini-games involve sliding cauldrons onto grills without getting them stuck in a corner.
Upper Castle. Collecting red beans in exchange for Flipendo Duo spell. Includes Transfiguration class, where you learn Avifors, a race level against Peeves in the attic to retrieve your parcel, a level where you must use the invisibility cloak to sneak past Filch and Mrs Norris, a race level to escape the troll attacking Hermione in the girl's toilet and a boss level to defeat it. Includes Quidditch match between Gryffindor and Ravenclaw.
Diagon Alley. Side quest requiring you to collect ingredients for a potion to cure Hagrid's dragon, Norbert. Involves collecting coins in the mines of Gringotts Bank through control of a mine cart and using the coins to complete mini-games in three shops to get the ingredients. It is self contained and has no bean collectables with Famous Witches and Wizard cards only awarded for good performance in the Gringotts challenges.
Forbidden Forest. Side quest to find a missing unicorn in the Forbidden Forest as a detention. Red beans continue to be collected in this level. Involves defeating magical creatures and using known spells to solve puzzles. Ends when the unicorn is found and Hagrid gives Harry a flute which can cause animals to fall asleep.
Defeating Voldemort. Completing a series of challenges and boss fights (against the Devil's snare and knights) using spells learned, flute and flying skills to solve leading up to the boss fight with Voldemort. After completing this, the game finishes with the Quidditch game between Gryffindor and Slytherin.

Game Boy Color
The Game Boy Color game is a role-playing game, similar to games like Pokémon and Final Fantasy. The player controls Harry, starting from when Hagrid brings him to Diagon Alley. It follows the story of the book closely, with almost all the scenes from that point on in the book being playable, except for the addition of bands of monsters such as rats, bats, and spiders roaming most of the locations. The spells are used for combat, rather than interacting with the environment.

Game Boy Advance
The Game Boy Advance game is completely different from the Game Boy Color game. The Game Boy Advance game is a top down puzzle game. The player explores Hogwarts, and must attend classes which often include a challenge of collecting a certain number of items, such as challenge stars or potion ingredients. This game features the familiar monsters from the other games in the series, such as snails and gnomes.

Plot

Rubeus Hagrid, a mysterious giant, leaves an orphaned Harry Potter, whose parents were murdered by the evil Lord Voldemort, on the front door step of his bullying relatives, The Dursleys. For ten years, Harry has lived with the Dursleys, not knowing that he is a wizard, and famous in the wizarding world for being the only one to survive the attacks of Voldemort, whose name no one dares to say. Harry receives a letter inviting him to attend Hogwarts School of Witchcraft and Wizardry and is told who he really is. After buying his school supplies at Diagon Alley, he boards the Hogwarts Express on platform 9¾ with the other students. Once they arrive at Hogwarts, the students are sorted into houses: Gryffindor, Hufflepuff, Ravenclaw and Slytherin. Harry is sorted into Gryffindor, after pleading with the Sorting Hat, a talking witch's hat, not to place him in Slytherin, notorious for being the house of darker witches and wizards, as well as Lord Voldemort. Once sorted, Harry meets Ron Weasley, a poor boy from a large, pure-blood, wizarding family and Hermione Granger, a witch born to Muggle parents.

At school, Harry begins his training as a wizard and learns more about his past. After retrieving a remembrall while riding on a broomstick, for his classmate Neville Longbottom, Harry is appointed seeker of the Gryffindor Quidditch team.

Harry, Ron and Hermione believe that one of their teachers, Professor Snape, is planning to steal the Philosopher's Stone, a magical object which grants the user immortality, and set out to stop him. The three face a series of obstacles that protect the stone, including a three-head dog, surviving a deadly plant, catching a flying key, playing a life-sized game of Chess and choosing the correct potion to get through a magical fire. Harry, now alone, expects to face Snape but instead finds Professor Quirrell, the Defence Against the Dark Arts teacher. Quirrell removes his turban and reveals that Voldemort was living on the back of his head. Harry retrieves the stone and Voldemort tries to get it from him but touching him burns Quirrell's skin. Harry passes out from the struggle of the battle.

He awakens in the school's hospital wing with Professor Dumbledore, the headmaster, by his side. Dumbledore explains that the stone has been destroyed but that its loss will not stop Voldemort from returning. He reassures Harry that if their battles do no more than slow Voldemort's return then he may never come back.

During the end-of-year feast, Gryffindor wins the House Cup. Harry sees it as the best evening of his life and one that he will never forget.

Development

Harry Potter and the Philosopher's Stone is based on the story of the same name and through working with Warner Bros. The game also features the sets and environment from the film adaptation. The PC version was developed by software company KnowWonder and was built on the Unreal Engine which allowed for it to play on both software and hardware-accelerated modes. EA was granted rights to the Harry Potter games in August 2000. The game's executive producer Chris Graham stated that the game was aimed at eight- to fourteen-year-olds with its puzzle-based gameplay. The PlayStation version was developed by Argonaut as an action-platform game which integrated a 3D environment into its gameplay, using the game engine they had previously developed for the Croc games. The Game Boy Color and Game Boy Advance versions were individually developed by Griptonite Games and Eurocom.

Philosopher's Stone was first revealed on the PC at the E3 expo in May 2001. A press release followed, months later, on 13 November 2001, days before the films 16 November release. The press release stated it would ship the game to coincide with the film adaptation of the same name.

Soundtrack
Jeremy Soule composed the music of Philosopher's Stone. The soundtrack was released digitally in 2006 but has since been withdrawn from sale.

Reception

Critical response

Computer and Video Games commented on Hogwarts saying it is a "curiously flat experience, and not helped by the chronically jerky frame rate." X-Play said the game's camera angles were "the worst offender ... It's a maddening and uncooperative system." Soundtrack Geek's Jon Blough identified Jeremy Soule's music for the soundtrack as too short. He also added that "the menacing and relaxing cues [in the music] fail[ed] to provide anything definitive." GameZone observed the tasks and quests and stated they ... aren't as compelling [as Chamber of Secrets], and the puzzles seem a little lacking."

GameSpot praised the developers' efforts, for the PlayStation version, in re-creating the Hogwarts castle and different looking characters, but said the game's graphics look like "extremely jagged polygons." It also praised the PlayStation version for its "bedtime-story-style narration" and the character voice overs, but criticised the game's lack of music. PlayStation Illustrated noted that the PlayStation version has poor camera angles, adding that only the use of the 'L' and 'R' buttons can fix the problem, as it is not angled in the direction Harry is facing. The "fun to play" Quidditch matches were praised by PlayStation Illustrated, who stated that the "matches were excellently done" and controlling Harry was easy. Jeremy Conrad from IGN called it "one of the best-looking PS One games" for its graphics, but said that this can cause the frame rate to lag. The easy gameplay for the PC version was criticised by GameSpot, adding that the auto jump function removes any form of a challenge from the block puzzle and platform sequences. GameSpot described the score by Jeremy Soule as "enjoyable", but its repetitiveness and shortness made for less variety throughout the game. GameSpot praised Game Boy Advance version for its well-animated graphics and environment, paying close attention to small details such as Harry's cape flapping while he moves and his spellcasting gestures. Game Vortex criticised the GBA version for its lagging graphics that occurs when casting the "Flipendo" spell, the repetitive environments for each spell challenge level. It also criticised not being able to jump over bottomless pits in the spell challenge levels, where falling down results in the level being played from the beginning. GameZone praised the overall gameplay, controls and graphics, for the GBA, commenting that it is "a solid, enjoyable product", but pointed out draw-backs such as the simplistic puzzles. Game Vortex and GameZone both praised the Game Boy Color version's well detailed environments, gameplay and colour usage, but was faulted for its lack of detail on enemy characters who appeared indiscernible to the main characters. IGN commented that those who had not read the books "may be left in the dark", as there is very little narrative in the game, and tends to be aimed at Harry Potter fans.

Sales
Philosopher's Stone received positive sale figures, despite mixed reviews. From November 2001, to February 2002 it was listed as one of the top three highest-selling PC video games, and was the top selling PC title in December 2001. In February 2002, the NPD Group listed it as the third top-selling PC game of 2001 after being available for only two months in North America. North American sales of its computer version reached 867,481 units by the end of 2001, which drew revenues of $24.6 million. The PlayStation version sold eight million copies, making it one of the best-selling PlayStation games and one of the best-selling video games of all time at the time of the release. The PlayStation version of The Philosopher's Stone received a "Platinum" sales award from the Entertainment and Leisure Software Publishers Association (ELSPA), indicating sales of at least 300,000 copies in the United Kingdom. ELSPA gave the game's computer version a "Gold" certification, for sales of at least 200,000 copies in the region. The game generated $500 million in revenue.

In the United States alone, The Philosopher's Stones computer version sold 1.3 million copies and earned $33.9 million by August 2006, after its release in November 2001. It was the country's fourth best-selling computer game between January 2000 and August 2006. Combined sales of all Harry Potter computer games released between January 2000 and August 2006, including The Philosopher's Stone, had reached 2.7 million units in the United States by the latter date.

In the United States, The Philosopher's Stones Game Boy Advance version sold 690,000 copies and earned $26 million by August 2006. During the period between January 2000 and August 2006, it was the 36th highest-selling game launched for the Game Boy Advance, Nintendo DS or PlayStation Portable in that country.

Awards
Both versions of the game received multiple nominations. The original version received three nominations from the Academy of Interactive Arts & Sciences for "Best Console Family Game", "Best Original Music Composition", and "Best PC Family Game" at the 5th Interactive Achievement Awards. It was also nominated for a Nickelodeon Kids' Choice Award in the "Favorite video game" category at the 2002 Nickelodeon Kids' Choice Awards.

The soundtrack received a nomination from the Academy of Interactive Arts & Sciences for Original Musical Composition in 2002 but lost to Tropico.

References

Further reading

External links
 
 
 
 
Harry Potter and the Sorcerer's Stone (Multi-Platform) Unofficial Archive Project at Internet Archive

2001 video games
Argonaut Games games
Aspyr games
Cancelled Nintendo 64 games
Classic Mac OS games
Electronic Arts games
Game Boy Advance games
Game Boy Color games
GameCube games
Griptonite Games
Harry Potter 1
Video games based on adaptations
PlayStation (console) games
PlayStation 2 games
Unreal Engine games
Video games based on films
Video games scored by Jeremy Soule
Video games developed in the United Kingdom
Video games set in castles
Video games set in London
Video games set in Scotland
Video games set in 1981
Video games set in 1991
Video games set in 1992
Video games set in the 1990s
Video games with alternative versions
Warner Bros. video games
Windows games
Xbox games
Eurocom games
Single-player video games
Video games developed in the United States
Westlake Interactive games
Amaze Entertainment games